Trevor Michael Thomas Kavanagh (born 19 January 1943) is a British/Australian journalist and former political editor of The Sun.

Early life and career
Kavanagh was educated at Reigate Grammar School before leaving school at 17 to work for newspapers in Surrey and later Hereford.

In 1965, he emigrated to Australia, working on several newspapers. After a short stint back in the United Kingdom working for the Bristol Evening Post, Kavanagh returned to Australia to work for the Sydney Daily Mirror (in Rupert Murdoch's News Corp. stable) on the political desk.

Career
In 1978, he returned to the UK permanently, taking a job on the news desk of The Sun, and then as an industrial correspondent in 1980. He was appointed as the paper's political editor in 1983.

In January 2004, Kavanagh claimed a huge scoop. An unnamed source telephoned Kavanagh with details of the Hutton Inquiry the night before it was officially published. Kavanagh was provided with accurate details of the report and published them ahead of the official release. He was however less accurate on 4 June 2009. Speaking on BBC 5Live he asserted that Gordon Brown would be out of office the next week. Shortly afterwards, he was named as the eighth most influential person in the British media – behind his proprietor Murdoch, but ahead of his editor, Rebekah Wade.

He covered his last UK General Election as political editor in May 2005. In December 2005, it was announced that he was to become an associate editor of The Sun in January. His successor as political editor was deputy, George Pascoe-Watson.

Kavanagh joined the board of the Independent Press Standards Organisation (IPSO) in December 2015. In February 2017, the IPSO found that a column by Kavanagh published in The Sun about allegedly false refugee claims was factually inaccurate. The adjudication by IPSO described Kavanagh's inaccuracies as creating "a significantly misleading impression."

In August 2017, The Sun published a column by Kavanagh which questioned what actions British society should take to deal with "The Muslim Problem". Kavanagh cited an opinion piece by Labour Shadow Secretary of State for Women and Equalities Sarah Champion MP several days previously as a reason that it was "now acceptable" to describe Muslims as a "specific rather than cultural problem". Sean O'Grady of The Independent stated that the column used language reminiscent of Nazi propaganda and Nazi phrases. A joint complaint was made to IPSO by the Board of Deputies of British Jews, Tell MAMA and Faith Matters. A statement by the groups said "The printing of the phrase 'The Muslim Problem' – particularly with the capitalisation and italics for emphasis – in a national newspaper sets a dangerous precedent, and harks back to the use of the phrase 'The Jewish Problem in the last century." 
A cross-party group of over 100 MPs from the Conservatives, Labour, the Liberal Democrats and the Greens subsequently signed a letter to the editor of The Sun demanding action over the column. The letter stated the MPs "were truly outraged by the hate and bigotry" in Kavanagh's column.

Kavanagh left the board of IPSO at the end of December 2017, two years into a three-year contract.

Personal life
Kavanagh is married and currently lives in London. He has two sons and three grandchildren. On TalkTV on 6th July 2022, he told Mike Graham that he held an Australian passport which he may use in the event Sadiq Khan became prime minister of the UK.

Bibliography

Articles

References

External links
 A transcript of Trevor Kavanagh interviewing then President George W. Bush
 London Evening Standard interview with Trevor Kavanagh

1943 births
Living people
English male journalists
English people of Irish descent
English political journalists
People educated at Reigate Grammar School
People from Epsom
The Sun (United Kingdom) people
Place of birth missing (living people)